The MTV Video Music Award for Best Pop was first given out in  under the name of Best Pop Video, as MTV began to put several teen pop acts in heavy rotation. Nominations, however, were not just limited to pop acts, as dance, R&B, pop/rock, and reggaeton artists have also received nominations throughout the award's history. In , MTV eliminated this award along with all of the genre categories, but it returned in 2008.  In , the word "Video" was removed from the names of all genre categories, leaving this award with its current name: Best Pop.

Britney Spears has received the most wins and nominations in this category, winning three awards out of seven nominations. NSYNC and Spears are the only acts to win the award for two consecutive years.

Winners and nominees
Winners are listed first and highlighted in bold.

1990s

2000s

2010s

2020s

Statistics

Most wins

 3 wins
 Britney Spears

 2 wins
 No Doubt
 NSYNC
 Ariana Grande

Most nominations

 7 nominations
 Britney Spears

 6 nominations
 Ariana Grande

 4 nominations
 Justin Bieber
 Christina Aguilera
 Beyoncé
 Bruno Mars
 NSYNC
 P!nk
 Taylor Swift
 Ed Sheeran

 3 nominations
 Adele
 Billie Eilish
 No Doubt
 Katy Perry
 Jonas Brothers
 Lady Gaga
 Harry Styles

See also
 MTV Europe Music Award for Best Pop

References

MTV Video Music Awards
Pop music awards
Awards established in 1999